Gil-dong is a dong, neighbourhood of Gangdong District in Seoul, South Korea.

History
Gil-dong is geographically located far away from the Han River, so the natives believe this area is easy to be settled and safe to avoid any damage from storm and flood, based on Feng shui Theory. In 1995, Seoul Subway Line 5 was passed through this area stopping at Gil-dong Station. On the area of Gil-dong, Gangdong Public Library, Sinmyung Middle School, Kangdong Sacred Heart Hospital of Hallym University and a Leadership Training Institute of Doosan Group named Yeongangwon is located.

Area information
The current postal code of Gil-dong is 134–010. 134 is for Gangdong-gu and 010 is for Gil-dong.

Notable people from Gil-dong
 Choi Ye-na (Hangul: 최예나), singer, rapper, dancer, entertainer and K-pop/J-pop idol, former member of K-pop/J-pop girlgroup Iz*One.

See also 
Administrative divisions of Gangdong-gu
Administrative divisions of Seoul
Administrative divisions of South Korea

References

External links
Gangdong-gu official website
Gangdong-gu map at the Gangdong-gu official website
 Gangdong-gu map
 The Gil 1-dong Resident office

Neighbourhoods of Gangdong District